David Stec (born 10 May 1994) is an Austrian professional association football player who plays as a right-back for Lechia Gdańsk.

Club career
In the summer of 2021, he returned to Austria and signed a two-year contract with TSV Hartberg.

Career statistics

External links 
 

1994 births
Footballers from Vienna
Living people
Austrian footballers
Austria under-21 international footballers
Association football defenders
SKN St. Pölten players
Pogoń Szczecin players
TSV Hartberg players
Lechia Gdańsk players
Austrian Football Bundesliga players
Ekstraklasa players
III liga players
Austrian expatriate footballers
Expatriate footballers in Poland
Austrian people of Polish descent